Ruth Price (born April 27, 1938) is an American jazz singer and Artistic Director of the Jazz Bakery in Los Angeles, California. Price attended ballet school in 1952. In 1954, she sang with Charlie Ventura and later worked as a singer and dancer in Philadelphia and New York City. She moved to Hollywood in 1957 and toured with Harry James from 1964 to 1965. In the 1960s and 1970s she had several TV appearances both as herself in musical specials and as an actress in popular TV shows of the time.

Price's repertoire includes many obscure, lesser-known gems from the Great American Songbook. She has worked as an adjunct assistant professor at the UCLA Department of Ethnomusicology.

Discography

Source:

References

American jazz singers
American women jazz singers
Living people
1938 births
People from Phoenixville, Pennsylvania
Jazz musicians from Pennsylvania
21st-century American women